Arizona State Route 101 (SR 101) or Loop 101 is a semi-beltway looping around the Phoenix Metropolitan Area in central Arizona. It connects several suburbs of Phoenix, including Tolleson, Glendale, Peoria, Scottsdale, Mesa, Tempe, and Chandler. Construction began in the late-1980s and was completed in 2002.

Loop 101 has three officially designated sections along its route:
 Agua Fria Freeway in the west valley from I-10 to I-17
 Pima Freeway in the east valley from I-17 to Loop 202 (Red Mountain Freeway)
 Price Freeway in the east valley from Loop 202 (Red Mountain Freeway) to Loop 202 (Santan Freeway)

Route description
Agua Fria Freeway

Loop 101 begins as the Agua Fria Freeway at a three-level interchange with I-10 in Tolleson west of Phoenix. From that point, the route heads north entering Phoenix then Glendale, passing State Farm Stadium and Gila River Arena. Continuing northward through Peoria, it encounters the Grand Avenue portion of US 60 and passes the Peoria Sports Complex before entering northwestern Glendale and curving east just past the Arrowhead Towne Center mall. The route then heads east along the Beardsley Road alignment.

Pima Freeway

Continuing east as the Pima Freeway, Loop 101 travels just south of Deer Valley Airport before intersecting the northern terminus of SR 51 at milepost 29. East of this junction, Loop 101 curves south through Scottsdale on the Pima Road alignment. The freeway then curves east and passes through the Salt River Pima-Maricopa Indian Community, just south of Via Linda providing access to Downtown Scottsdale, Scottsdale Pavilions, Scottsdale Community College, two casinos, and Scottsdale Fashion Square. Continuing south, Loop 101 encounters an interchange with the Red Mountain Freeway portion of Loop 202 in Tempe at milepost 51. This interchange is partially built over the Salt River.

Price Freeway

Loop 101 then becomes the Price Freeway and continues south, passing Arizona State University to the east. The route then intersects the Superstition Freeway portion of US 60 at milepost 55 before entering Chandler. Loop 101 provides access to Chandler Fashion Center just prior to concluding at milepost 61 at an interchange with the Santan Freeway portion of Loop 202.

History

1985–2007: Original Construction
Loop 101 was a part of the 1985 Maricopa County Regional Transportation Plan that was funded by a sales tax approved by Maricopa County voters that year. The freeway was originally assigned two different route numbers along its path: The Agua Fria Freeway portion was initially designated as SR 417, and the Pima/Price Freeway portion was initially designated as SR 117. The Loop 101 designation was first assigned on December 18, 1987, at which time the South Mountain Freeway and the portion of the San Tan Freeway between I-10 and Price Road were also designated to be part of Loop 101. On July 19, 1991, the proposed South Mountain Freeway was renumbered as part of Loop 202. The San Tan Freeway portion of Loop 101 has never officially been renumbered, though this freeway section has been signed as Loop 202 since its opening.

In 1990 after several years of negotiation with the Salt River Pima–Maricopa Indian Community, the state of Arizona paid the tribe $247 million for right of way for the nine-mile eastern leg of Loop 101 from Via Linda to the north bank of the Salt River. The resulting alignment kept all four corners of each interchange on tribal land, allowing the community to control and benefit from development. The tribe formed a development arm, Salt River DevCo, to manage these and other community developable properties.

Loop 101 was built in stages from 1988 to 2002. The first segment of Loop 101 opened in November 1988, consisting of the two-mile stretch from Peoria Avenue to Northern Avenue in Peoria. Throughout the next 14 years, the other 59 miles of the route would be built including the interchanges with I-10, I-17, both Loop 202 Freeways, and the US 60. The final segment that was built was the two-mile stretch from Scottsdale Road to Pima Road in Scottsdale that opened in April 2002, marking the full completion of the entire 61-mile route. Loop 101 was built with three general-purpose lanes in each direction along with one auxiliary lane with the exception of the three-mile stretch from Loop 202 (Red Mountain Freeway) to US 60 where there were four-general purpose lanes in each direction.   

In January 2006, Scottsdale installed speed enforcement cameras along its 7.8 mile stretch of Loop 101 to lower speeds and reduce collisions. There were six cameras placed in total, three in each direction. The trial phase lasted from January to October 2006 before resuming full time in February 2007. There had been much criticism of the program since its inception, and it ended in 2010.

2007–present: Recent Improvements
Between 2007 and 2011, HOV lanes were constructed along the entire route in different phases. It included construction of direct HOV ramps between Loop 101 east and SR 51 south in Northern Phoenix and Loop 101 north and Loop 202 east (Santan Freeway) in Chandler.

The Maryland Avenue HOV interchange in Glendale began construction in October 2013 and was completed in March 2014.

In August 2014, construction began to add a fourth general-purpose lane in each direction for the 11-mile segment from Shea Boulevard to Loop 202 in Scottsdale. Construction was completed in October 2016.

The 64th Street interchange in northeast Phoenix was opened in May 2015 after being built in 2008.

Bethany Home Road was renamed Cardinals Way to honor the Arizona Cardinals in February 2019.

In February 2019, construction began to add a fourth general-purpose lane in each direction for the 13-mile segment from I-17 to Pima Road in Scottsdale and northeast Phoenix. Construction was completed in January 2022.

In May 2019, construction began to add a fourth general-purpose lane in each direction for the 6.4-mile segment from Baseline Road to Loop 202 (Santan Freeway) in the east valley. Construction was completed in August 2020.

Future
Construction is planned to begin in late 2023 to add a fourth general-purpose lane in each direction for the 4.5-mile segment from Princess Drive to Shea Boulevard in Scottsdale.

Construction is planned to begin in early 2024 to add a fourth general-purpose lane in each direction for the six-mile segment from 75th Avenue to I-17 in the northwest valley.

Direct HOV lane connections are planned to be constructed at the I-10 interchange between Loop 101 and I-10 east. Construction is planned to begin in 2025 and be completed in 2027.

The Northern Avenue interchange in Peoria is planned to be upgraded to a diverging diamond interchange (DDI). It will be the first DDI on Loop 101, and construction is expected to begin in 2025 and be completed in 2027.

Exit list

See also
 
 
 Roads and freeways in metropolitan Phoenix
 Loop 202
 Loop 303

References

External links
 Agua Fria Loop 101 construction history
 Pima Loop 101 construction history
 Price Loop 101 construction history

101
101
Transportation in Maricopa County, Arizona
Transportation in Peoria, Arizona
Transportation in Mesa, Arizona
Transportation in Glendale, Arizona
Transportation in Chandler, Arizona
Transportation in Scottsdale, Arizona
Transportation in Tempe, Arizona